Suddagunte Palya or S.G.Palya  is an area located in South Bangalore, off Hosur Road. It is 10 km from Kempegowda Bus Station and Bangalore City Railway Station and 40 km from Bangalore International Airport. The locality is home to various paying guests accommodations and hostels as Christ University is located here. Major organizations and institutions in the area includes Christ University, Dharmaram College, Srinivasa Theatre and a number of restaurants.

Location

References

Neighbourhoods in Bangalore